Quinten may refer to:

People

Surname
 Christopher Quinten (born 1957), British actor

Given name
 Quinten Burg (born 1948), American politician
 Quinten Hann (born 1977), Australian snooker player
 Quinten Hermans (born 1995), Belgian cyclist
 Quinten Lawrence (born 1984), American football player
 Quinten Lynch (born 1983), Australian football player
 Quinten Rollins (born 1992), American football player
 Quinten Strange (born 1996), New Zealand rugby player
 Quinten Timber (born 2001), Dutch football player
 Quinten van Dalm (born 1972), Dutch badminton player

Places
 Quinten, Switzerland

Other
 Quinten, string quartet, number 2 of String Quartets, Op. 76 (Haydn)

See also
 Quentin